Christmas Oratorio, BWV 248, is an oratorio by Johann Sebastian Bach intended for performance in church during the Christmas season.

Christmas Oratorio may also refer to:

Christmas oratorio, an oratorio written for Christmas or the Christmas season
Oratorio de Noël, an 1858 oratorio by composer Camille Saint-Saëns
The Christmas Oratorio, a 1983 novel by Swedish author Göran Tunström
, a 1996 film version of The Christmas Oratorio